George Olliver is a Canadian music artist. A singer and organist,  he was the lead singer for Mandala in the 1960s. He also founded the late 1960s, early 1970s jazz rock group Natural Gas.

Background
As a boy he was in the Anglican church choir. His parents also enrolled him in piano lessons which continued into his early teen years. His first band was the Cool Cats, a high school band.
He was with Natural Gas, playing at The Laugh In in Victoria Street, Montreal in early 1970 when was noted by a reviewer for Montreal newspaper The Gazzette that his stage act could range from a frantic singing and dancing of a James Brown to a laid back balladeer. He has been referred to as "The Blue Eyed Prince. The biggest influence on his career was Domenic Troiano.

In 1987, he was Nominated for a Juno Award for his album Dream Girl.

Apart from music, Olliver has only had one day job and that was in an office job with Canadian Pacific Railway.

Career

1960s to 1970s
Olliver, and guitarist Domenic Troiano became part of Mandala in the mid-60s. A song he composed, "Lost Love" was the B side of the Mandala single, "Opportunity" which was ready for release in October 1966.

Olliver quit the group in September, 1967 and some time afterwards formed the 10-piece soul outfit, George Olliver & His (Soul) Children. He later formed Natural Gas in 1969, a group that rivalled Lighthouse, Chicago and Blood Sweat & Tears. They had a hit with "All Powerful Man" which peaked at #76 on May 9th, 1970. It spent a total of 7 weeks in the Canadian charts. Their album got into the Canadian Top 10, and made the Top 50 in the United States.

By Early July, 1972, his group George Olliver and Friends had been signed to Shining Star Associates, a new marketing company that was located in Hamilton, Ontario.

In 1973, Olliver released a solo single, "I May Never Get to See You Again" on Much Records which he composed himself. It was produced by the label's A&R man, Bill Hill. According to Billboard, the single was marking his recording comeback.  In 1976, he had another single released. The song "Don't Let the Green Grass Fool You" had Dianne Brooks helping out with background vocals.

Later in the 1970s, he experienced a life-changing event which turned him towards Christianity.

1980s to 2000s
In May, 1983, the live album, Live at the Bluenote was released. With jay Jackson as emcee, the songs included "Fannie Mae" by Jayson King, "In the Midnight Hour" by Roy Kenner, Shawne Jackson on "Heatwave", "Up On the Roof" by Olliver and more.

As of 2006 he was performing with two of his bands, one was George Olliver & Gangbuster, and the other, his gospel band, Caught Away.
In 2008, he released a gospel album, George Olliver's Gospel Soul - Look Up. 

In May, 2010, he was booked to appear at the Books for Reading World Literacy Concert, a fund raiser held at St. Andrew’s Place in Sudbury to help with costs of sending a shipping of a container of school supplies to a developing country.

October, 2013 marked his 50th year in the music business.

In 2016, he was appearing with his band Gangbuster in Peterborough.

On Friday January 05, 2018, Cashbox Canada announced that he was to receive the Cashbox Canada Legacy Award.

Personal life
He is now a Christian.

Discography

Further reading
 The London Free Press, Oct 02, 2013: - George Olliver marks 50 years of playing rhythm and blues, soul and rock this year. Joe Belanger
 Cashbox Canada, Fri Jan 05, 2018 Canadian Icon George Olliver to Receive the Cashbox Canada Legacy Award by Sandy Graham
 FYI Music News, June 15, 2018:  A Conversation With .. George Olliver by Bill King
 Article: If any Canadian outfit had the talent to make it south of the border during the '60s, it was Toronto outfit Mandala

References

External links
 Discogs: George Olliver
 A NEW WAY / Joy Ministries
 The Canadian Pop Music Encyclopedia, OLLIVER, George

Male organists
Canadian organists
Quality Records artists
Natural Gas (musical group) members